, also known as OAB, is a Japanese broadcast network affiliated with the ANN. Their headquarters are located in Oita Prefecture.

The Headquarters
 12 Shinkawa-nishi Oita-city, OITA 870-8524 JAPAN

History
1993 October 1: It was set up as Oita Prefecture's third broadcasting station.
1 December 2006: the network's Oita Main Station commenced their Digital terrestrial television broadcasting service.

Stations

Analog
Oita (Main Station) JOBX-TV 24ch 10 kW
Saiki 31ch 100w
Hita 49ch 20w
Tsukumi 28ch 10w
Taketa 31ch 30w
Kusu 27ch 100w
Mie 21ch 100w
Kunisaki 62ch 100w
Nakatsu 17ch 100w
Notsubaru 18ch 30w
Yufuin 37ch 3w
Usuki 33ch 3w
Oita-East 62ch 10w
Ajimu 40ch
Shonai 39ch
Ogata 27ch
Higashi-Wasada 31ch
Naoiri 54ch
Oita-South 38ch
Beppu-Kamegawa 60ch
Notsuichi 41ch
Usuki-Kaizoe 59ch
Yamaga-Wakamiya 40ch
Oita-Takasaki 51ch

Digital(ID:5)
Oita(Main Station) JOBX-DTV 32ch

Programs
Rejaguru TV - from 12:00 until 13:00 on Saturdays
Super J Channel Oita - from 18:30 until 18:54 on Weekdays
Oita Jōhō Daijiten - from 07:30 until 07:45 on Saturdays
Trinita EXPRESS - from 24:40 until 24:45 on Sundays
SOLD OUT - from 23:54 until 24:00 on Saturdays, from 25:30 until 25:45 on Sundays
TOWN SPACE - from 15:55 until 16:00 on Weekdays
Eki no aru fukei - from 17:25 until 17:30 on Saturdays

Rival Stations
Oita Broadcasting System(OBS)
Television Oita System(TOS)

Other links
OAB Oita Asahi Broadcasting

All-Nippon News Network
Asahi Shimbun Company
Television stations in Japan
Ōita Prefecture
Television channels and stations established in 1993
Mass media in Ōita (city)
Companies based in Ōita Prefecture